Lewis Lake is a lake in Kanabec County, in the U.S. state of Minnesota.

Lewis Lake bears the name of a pioneer who settled there.

See also
List of lakes in Minnesota

References

Lakes of Minnesota
Lakes of Kanabec County, Minnesota